The 2019 Austrian Darts Championship was the tenth of thirteen PDC European Tour events on the 2019 PDC Pro Tour. The tournament took place at the Multiversum Schwechat, Vienna, Austria, from 30 August–1 September 2019. It featured a field of 48 players and £140,000 in prize money, with £25,000 going to the winner.

Mensur Suljović won his third European Tour title, and his first in his home country, with an 8–7 win against Michael van Gerwen in the final.

Prize money
This is how the prize money is divided:

 Seeded players who lose in the second round do not receive this prize money on any Orders of Merit.

Qualification and format
The top 16 entrants from the PDC ProTour Order of Merit on 11 June will automatically qualify for the event and will be seeded in the second round.

The remaining 32 places will go to players from six qualifying events – 18 from the UK Tour Card Holder Qualifier (held on 21 June), six from the European Tour Card Holder Qualifier (held on 21 June), two from the West & South European Associate Member Qualifier (held on 29 August), four from the Host Nation Qualifier (held on 29 August), one from the Nordic & Baltic Qualifier (held on 9 March), and one from the East European Qualifier (held on 24 August).

From 2019, the Host Nation, Nordic & Baltic and East European Qualifiers will only be available to non-Tour Card holders. Any Tour Card holders from the applicable regions will have to play the main European Qualifier.

Corey Cadby withdrew prior to the tournament, which meant an extra place was made available in the Host Nation Qualifier.

The following players will take part in the tournament:

Top 16
  Michael van Gerwen (runner-up)
  Ian White (quarter-finals)
  Gerwyn Price (third round)
  Daryl Gurney (second round)
  Peter Wright (semi-finals)
  Adrian Lewis (third round)
  Mensur Suljović (champion)
  Dave Chisnall (third round)
  Ricky Evans (quarter-finals)
  Steve Beaton (second round)
  Michael Smith (second round)
  Joe Cullen (third round)
  Jonny Clayton (second round)
  Simon Whitlock (second round)
  Nathan Aspinall (second round)
  Darren Webster (second round)

UK Qualifier
  Ted Evetts (first round)
  Stephen Bunting (first round)
  Chris Dobey (first round)
  Gavin Carlin (first round)
  William O'Connor (first round)
  James Wilson (third round)
  Keegan Brown (third round)
  Cameron Menzies (quarter-finals)
  Kyle Anderson (second round)
  Kirk Shepherd (second round)
  Ross Smith (first round)
  Justin Pipe (first round)
  Jamie Hughes (first round)
  Josh Payne (first round)
  Mark Webster (first round)
  Luke Humphries (second round)
  Brendan Dolan (second round)

European Qualifier
  Dimitri Van den Bergh (second round)
  Jermaine Wattimena (first round)
  Jeffrey de Zwaan (third round)
  Christian Bunse (second round)
  Rowby-John Rodriguez (quarter-finals)
  Vincent van der Voort (semi-finals)

West/South European Qualifier
  Mike De Decker (third round)
  Kevin Münch (first round)

Host Nation Qualifier
  Alex Steinbauer (first round)
  Rusty-Jake Rodriguez (second round)
  Christian Gödl (first round)
  Hannes Schnier (first round)
  Dietmar Burger (second round)

Nordic & Baltic Qualifier
  Cor Dekker (first round)

East European Qualifier
  Adam Gawlas (second round)

Draw

References

2019 PDC Pro Tour
2019 PDC European Tour
2019 in Austrian sport
August 2019 sports events in Austria
September 2019 sports events in Austria